Ricardo Urzúa Rivera (born 19 May 1966) is a Mexican politician from the Institutional Revolutionary Party. Since 4 September 2014 he serves as Senator of the LXII Legislature of the Mexican Congress. He previously served as Deputy of the LXI Legislature of the Mexican Congress representing Puebla.

References

1966 births
Living people
Politicians from Mexico City
Members of the Senate of the Republic (Mexico)
Members of the Chamber of Deputies (Mexico)
Institutional Revolutionary Party politicians
21st-century Mexican politicians